Vigil Spur is a spur which borders Ebbe Glacier and forms the southwest extremity of Mount Bolt in the Anare Mountains, Antarctica. So named by the northern party of New Zealand Geological Survey Antarctic Expedition (NZGSAE), 1963–64, because it spent a prolonged period of time here due to blizzard conditions which prevented travel.

Ridges of Victoria Land
Pennell Coast